Shaqib al-Salam or Segev Shalom and also known as  Shqeb as-Salam, is a Bedouin town and a local council in the Southern District of Israel, southeast of Beersheba.

Shaqib was founded in 1979 as part of a government project to settle Negev Bedouins in permanent settlements, and declared a local council in 1996. It is one of seven Bedouin townships in the Negev desert with approved plans and developed infrastructure alongside Hura, Tel as-Sabi (Tel Sheva), Ar'arat an-Naqab (Ar'ara BaNegev), Lakiya, Kuseife (Kseife) and the city of Rahat, the largest among them.

Etymology
Township's name "Segev Shalom" comes from a Sagiv river that flows nearby and also relates to the Camp David Accords between Egypt and Israel (Shalom stands for peace in Hebrew) signed the same year the township was founded.

History

Prior to the establishment of Israel, the Negev Bedouins were a semi-nomadic society that had been through a process of sedentariness since the Ottoman rule of the region.

During the British Mandate, the administration did not provide a legal frame to justify and preserve lands’ ownership. In order to settle this issue, Israel’s land policy was adapted to a large extent from the Ottoman land regulations of 1858 as the only preceding legal frame. Thus Israel nationalized most of the Negev lands using the state’s land regulations from 1969.

Shaqib al-Salam/Segev Shalom was founded in 1979 based on an agreement reached with Azazmeh Sheikh Ouda which allowed the tribe to settle on its traditional lands. The Segev Shalom local council, with nine members, was created as an instrument of local government. In 2000, the council held mayoral elections.

Demographics
According to the Israel Central Bureau of Statistics (CBS), the population of Shaqib was 7,739 in December 2010, up from 6,500 in December 2006. The average population growth rate here was 5.5%.

Shaqib al-Salam's jurisdiction is 5,981 dunams (~6 km²). Most residents belong to various clans of the al-Azazme tribe which also populates Bir Hadaj, and also to Tarabin.

Economy
The township is situated close to Beersheva so its economy is closely related to that of the city. Several industrial parks are situated in the area: Beersheba, Hura, Ramat Hovav, Idan HaNegev and Rahat. Residents also work in the services industry in Beersheba. There are several organizations that promote entrepreneurship among the 160,000 Bedouins living in the Negev, primarily aimed at Bedouin women.

As of 2015, the average monthly income was 4,908 shekels.

In May 2010 a One Stop Employment Center was established in Shaqib al-Salam to facilitate the integration of Bedouins into the workplace. It has dramatically increased the proportion of Bedouins employed.

Education and culture
There is a number of organizations carrying out different activities aimed at supporting and facilitating entrepreneurship in Israel's South in order to further integrate the 160,000 Bedouins living in the Negev into Israel's mainstream economy. They are primarily aimed at Bedouin women.

Twenty Arab-Bedouin women from the towns of Rahat, Lakiya, Tel Sheva, Segev Shalom, Kuseife and Rachma participated in a sewing course for fashion design at the Amal College in Beer Sheva, including lessons on sewing and cutting, personal empowerment and business initiatives.

Healthcare
There is a branch of Clalit Health Services in the township, as well as several Tipat Halav perinatal (baby care) centers.

Parks and landmarks
The Jewish National Fund built a central park with an amphitheater adjacent to the community’s town hall.

See also

 Arab localities in Israel
 Negev Bedouin

References

External links
 Shaqib al-Salam's Facebook page
 Fire within. A film about Jacobs International Teen Leadership Institute' program on bringing the American Jewish youth, Israeli Jewish youth and Israeli Bedouin youth together
 Lands of the Negev, a short film presented by Israel Land Administration describing the challenges faced in providing land management and infrastructure to the Bedouins in Israel's southern Negev region

Arab localities in Israel
Bedouin localities in Israel
Populated places established in 1979
Local councils in Southern District (Israel)
Populated places in Southern District (Israel)
1979 establishments in Israel